Cj (Jeffrey) Vanston is an American film composer, record producer, songwriter, and keyboardist, based in Hollywood, California. He was born in Denver, Colorado, the son of Bonnie L. Smith and Paul L. Vanston.

Film credits
 1996 Waiting for Guffman
 1998 Almost Heroes
 2000 Best in Show
 2002 Sweet Home Alabama
 2003 A Mighty Wind
 2005 Slingshot
 2006 For Your Consideration
 2016 Mascots

TV series
 2013 Family Tree

Album credits
Vanston has contributed to numerous albums, including those by Prince, 'NSync, Barbra Streisand, Ringo Starr,  Jaguares, Celine Dion, Bob Seger, Richard Marx, Tina Turner, Alexz Johnson, Joe Cocker, Peter Cetera, Anna Vissi, Yellowcard,  Spinal Tap, Harry Shearer, Steve Lukather, Def Leppard, Dennis DeYoung, The Believers, Toto and most recently co-wrote, co-produced and performed on Jeff “Skunk” Baxter's 2022 solo release called “Speed of Heat”.

References

External links
 
 Reggie Boyle talking to CJ Vanston Interview - By Arend, Dec 22, 2011 12:00 AM
 CJ talking about working with Luke on Transition Interview - By Arend, Oct 26, 2012 12:00 AM
 CJ Vanston: I wanted to show the World what a great f***ing band Toto is Interview - By Arend, Feb 6, 2015 10:26 AM
 CJ Vanston Interview NAMM Oral History Library (2017)

21st-century American keyboardists
21st-century American male musicians
American film score composers
American male film score composers
Songwriters from Colorado
20th-century American keyboardists
Living people
Musicians from Denver
Year of birth missing (living people)
The Beyman Bros members
20th-century American male musicians
American male songwriters